Rhashan Stone is an American actor and comedian based in the UK. He is best known for appearing in many comedy shows such as Desmond's and Mutual Friends. Stone is also a stage actor who has performed in numerous productions for The Royal Shakespeare Company, The National Theatre, The Royal Court and in London's West End. His roles have included the heroic soldier Claudio in Much Ado About Nothing, Hero in the Sondheim musical A Funny Thing Happened on the Way to the Forum, and the king's brother Clarence in Richard III. Stone is a singer and musician in a wide range of styles, including jazz, soul and gospel. He is also a classically trained singer, musician and composer, and also works occasionally as a playwright.

Early life
Stone was born in Elizabeth, New Jersey to Joanne Stone; he does not know who his father was.

When he was six years old his mother married the English singer/songwriter Russell Stone and they moved to the UK to live with him. Together, his mother and stepfather formed the singing duo R&J Stone. They were very successful and became known for their song "We Do It". His aunt Madeline Bell was also involved in the music industry and became the lead singer for Blue Mink. Stone himself is an accomplished singer multi-instrumentalist.

When Stone was 11, his mother died from a brain tumor. Later, he joined Mountview Academy of Theatre Arts. While at Mountview, Stone was offered a role in the West End musical Five Guys Named Moe. He has worked consistently ever since in theatre, film, and television.

Filmography

Personal life
Stone married actress Olivia Williams in 2003. The couple have two daughters.

External links
 
 Accidental playwright The Telegraph
 Rhashan Stone plays De in Mutual Friends BBC News

Male actors from New Jersey
American emigrants to England
Living people
1969 births
Actors from Norfolk
American expatriate male actors in the United Kingdom